John Heap may refer to:

 John Heap (geographer) (1932–2006), English polar scientist
 John Heap (athlete) (1907–2000), English athlete who competed for Great Britain in the 1928 Summer Olympics
 John Heap (cricketer) (1857–1931), English cricketer
 John Heap (Klutter!), character